Stade Jean Alric is a rugby union stadium, in Aurillac, France. 

It is the home stadium of Stade Aurillacois Cantal Auvergne. The stadium can hold 9,000 people (7,000 seated).

It has been named after Jean Alric, a player of the club shot by the SS on June 5, 1944.

References

Jean Alric
Sports venues in Cantal
Sports venues completed in 1924